Dương Thụ (Vân Đình, Ứng Hòa Hanoi, 10 February 1943) is a Vietnamese songwriter.

Notable works
 Ru em bằng tiếng sóng
 Họa mi hót trong mưa
 Hơi thở mùa xuân
 Bay vào ngày xanh
 Cho em một ngày
 Đánh thức tầm xuân
 Nghe mưa
 Vẫn hát lời tình yêu
 Em đi qua tôi
 Bài hát ru cho anh

Discography
 Dương Thụ & Arlene Estrella (Philippines) SUN DANCE (Live Music Live Sound) [Nhạc Việt Lời Anh]

References

External links
Dương Thụ's profile on Nhacso.net, photo
Nghe Album : Tình khúc Dương Thụ CD

People from Hanoi
1943 births
Vietnamese songwriters
Living people